Radoboj is a village and municipality in  Krapina-Zagorje County in Croatia. In the 2011 census, the total population was 3,387, in the following settlements:
 Bregi Radobojski, population 445
 Gorjani Sutinski, population 145
 Gornja Šemnica, population 627
 Jazvine, population 382
 Kraljevec Radobojski, population 49
 Kraljevec Šemnički, population 117
 Orehovec Radobojski, population 282
 Radoboj, population 1,282
 Strahinje Radobojsko, population 58

In the 2011 census, 99.0% of the population were Croats.

Fossil site 
Radoboj is particularly famous as a major fossil site. During the 19th Century a large number of fossils from the Miocene were excavated here. Especially notable are the well preserved insects fossils which were described by the Swiss palaeontologist Oswald Heer. Most of this type material is currently in Landesmuseum Joanneum, Graz, there is also considerable material from Radoboj in the Natural History Museum in Zagreb.

Sport 
Football club NK Radoboj in the 4th League.

Notable people 
 Sida Košutić, novelist
 Literary manifestation Sida Košutić Days in her honor.

References

External links
 

Populated places in Krapina-Zagorje County
Municipalities of Croatia